X Factor is a Romanian television music competition that aims to find a new music talent to become a star. The seventh season will started airing on 10 September 2017 on Antena 1.

The hosts are the same as in the first six seasons: Răzvan Simion and Dani Oțil, who are also known for hosting a well known morning show on Antena 1. Delia Matache, Horia Brenciu, Carla's Dreams and Ștefan Bănică, Jr. returned to the judging panel.

Jeremy Ragsdale won the competition, making Horia Brenciu's second win as a mentor.

Judges

 Delia Matache

Delia Matache is a famous Romanian eurobeat singer-songwriter, TV celebrity, dancer, philanthropist, former model, fashion designer. She has started her stage music activity in 1999 in N&D music band with Nicolae Marin and had released 4 albums, and after the split off in 2003 she had released another two solo albums.

 Horia Brenciu

Horia Brenciu is a Romanian singer, television host for the Romanian version of Dancing with the Stars, successful entertainer, and philanthropist. He studied at National College Andrei Şaguna from Braşov, then he continued to Şcoala Populară de Artă Braşov, at piano and canto class, and in 1998 he graduated The Theater Academy in Bucharest.

 Ștefan Bănică, Jr.

Ștefan Bănică, Jr. is a Romanian entertainer, of Roma people origin on his father side, TV presenter, one of the most important Romanian TV personality, the son of actor Ștefan Bănică.  He is well known in Romanian for presenting the Romanian version of “Dancing with the Stars”, the largest dance competition ever aired in Romania, broadcast on Pro TV.

 Carla's Dreams

Carla's Dreams is a Moldavian musical project which was initiated by Dobra Robert in 2012. The band is an anonymous group of singers and composers who sing in Romanian, Russian and English. During concerts the band's vocalist wears hood, sunglasses and a masked to hide his identity.

Established in Chișinău, Carla's Dreams combines several musical styles, including hip hop, jazz, rock and pop. The first song produced by Carla's Dreams was Dă-te ("Get Off"). Carla's Dreams has launched in Romania in 2013, along with Inna with the song P.O.H.U.I., later to sing with Loredana "Lumea Ta" ("Your World"), and in 2015 with Delia, releasing songs "Cum Ne Noi" ("How We Us") and "Da, Mamă" ("Yes, Mother").

Auditions

Audition process was based on the British and American version. First up were "The Producer's Audition", where the producers chose singers to proceed to the second phase which was "The Audition before the Judging panel".

The auditions were broadcast from 8 September 2017 until 17 November 2017. The auditions consisted in 11 episodes.

Bootcamp
This season, there will be four categories : Boys (14–24 years), Girls (14–24 years), Over 24s and the Groups.

Brenciu will mentor the Over 24s, Bănică the Boys, Carla's Dream the Groups and Matache will mentor the Girls.

Complete Teams
Color key
 – Eliminated in Four-chair challenge
 – Eliminated in Duels
 – Finalist
 – Wildcard

Four-chair challenge
This season, the categories will face the four-chair challenge. From the 41 acts competing (the Girls category had an extra act), at the end of this round, only 16 acts will go further in the competition.

The four-chair challenge were broadcast from 23 November 2017 until 7 December 2017. This consisted in 4 episodes, one for each group.

Color key
 – Contestant was immediately eliminated after performance without switch
 – Contestant was switched out later in the competition and eventually eliminated
 – Contestant was not switched out and made the final four of their own category

Notes
  1. The act Alina Mocanu was switched with Teodora Sava and therefore eliminated. After the performance of Isabela Chitoșcă, Delia decided to recall Alina Mocanu in the competition, stating she has made a mistake, concluding with Ana Nica Văcari elimination.
  2. The act Debu & Văsâi was offered a chair, but due to Debu's response when asked if they want a chair ("I don't care"), Carla's decided to eliminate them.

Duels
At the end of this round there will be 8 acts remaining, two for each category. 
The duels were broadcast on 8 December 2017.

Colour key:

 - Artist won the Duel and advanced to the Live shows

 - Artist lost the Duel and was eliminated

Wildcard
In this season, like season 6, the public will have the chance to save one of the acts that competed in the Auditions. The most voted act will go directly to the Live Shows. In the first live show if one of the mentor decides to take him in his team, then he will go further in the competition, otherwise he will be sent home.

The winner of this season selected by the public was Francesca Nicolescu, from the Girls Category.

Finalists
The nine finalists will compete in the Live Shows.
Color Key
 – Winner
 – Runner-up
 – Third place

Live shows

Results summary
Color key

Live show details

Live Show 1–15 December 2017

Live Show 2: Semifinal - 17 December 2017

Live Show 3: Final - 22 December 2017

Round 1
 Theme: Duet with special guest and with their mentor

Round 2
 Theme: Final

Ratings

References

X Factor (Romanian TV series)
Romania 07
2017 Romanian television seasons
Antena 1 (Romania) original programming